Bard Zard or Bardezard may refer to:
 Bard Zard, Fars
 Bard Zard, Andika, Khuzestan Province
 Bard Zard, Bagh-e Malek, Khuzestan Province
 Bard Zard, Dehdez, Izeh County, Khuzestan Province
 Bard Zard, Susan, Izeh County, Khuzestan Province
 Bard Zard, Kohgiluyeh and Boyer-Ahmad